The Lukunga River is a river that flows through the capital city of Kinshasa in the Democratic Republic of the Congo, a tributary of the Congo River.
Kinshasa lies on a plain that is surrounded by hills, drained by many rivers. Of these, the Lukunga is one of the more important, and for this reason gives its name to the Lukunga District of the city.

The river drains Ngaliema, the Mama Mobutu neighborhood and part of Mont-Ngafula, and forms the boundary between Ngaliema and Mont-Ngafule.

Before independence, one of the two water treatment plants for Leopoldville, now Kinshasa, was on the Lukunga river at Kinsuka in the Ngaliema district.  The station had been designed to last for 30 years with normal maintenance, but was in very poor shape by 1985.
The catchment area was protected by dense forest cover until the 1970s.
Since then, unplanned agriculture and building have exposed the steep and sandy soils to erosion by heavy rainfalls, raising levels of turbidity to the point where the station must halt operations.
Frequent dredging is needed to keep the channel open, as well as use of imported chemical coagulants and lime to make the water drinkable.

References

Sources

Rivers of the Democratic Republic of the Congo
Congo drainage basin